Sean Devereux (25 November 1964 – 2 January 1993) was a British Salesian missionary and aid worker murdered in Kismayo, Somalia in 1993 while working for UNICEF. He has since become an important role model for the aid-working vocation, particularly among Christians.

Sean Devereux died at the age of 28. Sean Devereux was the only son of Dermot Devereux, a British Airways cabin steward from Wexford, Ireland, and his wife Maureen, a nurse from Cork. He grew up in Yateley, Hampshire. He was educated at Salesian College, Farnborough and the University of Birmingham, obtaining his honours degree in Sports, Science, and Geography, and then training as a teacher at the University of Exeter. He became a popular master of Physical Education at the Salesian College in Chertsey, Surrey, teaching for two academic years before departing to take up missionary work in Africa.

He arrived in Liberia in February 1989 and began work with the Salesian community at St. Francis School in Tappita District, briefly finding himself imprisoned after pleading for the release of a student drafted into the army as a child-soldier. In his second year, escalating violence during the Liberian Civil War had forced the closing of the school and Devereux joined the UN refugee agency, where on one occasion he was beaten by soldiers after confronting one of them for attempting to steal food meant for refugees. Ultimately he was ordered out of the country in September 1992 and Devereux duly left for a brief stint in Sierra Leone.

He then began working with UNICEF in Somalia, where he was assigned to organise relief for the starving, particularly children, in Kismayo, the stronghold of one of many warlords. After only four months in the country, Devereux was fatally shot in the back of the  head by a lone hired gunman while walking near the UNICEF compound on Saturday, 2 January 1993. His assassination came on the eve of the visit to Mogadishu by UN Secretary General Boutros Boutros-Ghali.

'Sean Devereux Park' in Yateley is named in his honour and a plaque commemorates him.

A BBC Everyman Documentary was produced about Sean Devereux.  It is called 'Mr Sean' and was created in May 1993.  This was followed by a BAFTA-nominated movie about Sean called 'The Dying of the Light'.

References

Further reading

The Dying of the Light - Movie, directed by Peter Kosminsky. IMDb

BBC Documentary 'Mr Sean'. IMDb 2 May 1993

External links 
 Sean Devereux Children's Fund
 
 El Fondo Sean Devereux para ayudar a niños y jóvenes pobres en Liberia (The Sean Devereux Fund to help poor children and youth in Liberia)
 Breve biografía de Sean Devereux (Short Biography of Sean Devereux)
 Biografía de Sean Devereux, LOS FRUTOS DEL SISTEMA PREVENTIVO de Don Pascual Chávez Villanueva (Only spanish)

Roman Catholic missionaries in Somalia
Roman Catholic missionaries in Liberia
English Roman Catholic missionaries
UNICEF people
1964 births
1993 deaths
People educated at Salesian College, Farnborough
Alumni of the University of Birmingham
British expatriates in Somalia
British expatriates in Liberia
Deaths by firearm in Somalia
People murdered in Somalia
British people murdered abroad
British officials of the United Nations